Тhe 2017 Liga 3 (formerly Meore Liga) was the first season under its current name and 30th third-tier season in Georgia. It began on 19 March and ended on 24 November.

Team changes

After the 2016 season many teams changed their division. A total 56 of them were relegated from this division only, which reduced the number of participants from 64 to 20 within one season. This exodus resulted from the announced reorganization of the entire league system and a transitional status given to all domestic divisions before these changes could take effect in 2017.

Relegated from Pirveli Liga 
 
Borjomi  ● Skuri Tsalenjikha ● Sulori Vani ● Chiatura ● Sapovnela Terjola ● Odishi 1919 Zugdidi ● Gardabani ● Chkherimela Kharagauli ● Imereti ● Mark Stars Tbilisi ●  Liakhvi Tskhinvali ● Kolkheti Khobi

Relegated from Meore Liga

West
Sairme Bagdati ● Torpedo Kutaisi-2 ● Racha Ambrolauri ● Samgurali Tskaltubo-2 ● Imereti Khoni-2 ● Meshakhte Tkibuli-2 ● Mertskhali Ozurgeti ● Salkhino Martvili ● Lesichine ● Machakhela Khelvachauri ● Egrisi Senaki ● Chela Darcheli ●  Kolkheti Khobi-2 ● Bakhmaro Chokhatauri ● Khikhani Khulo ● Dinamo Batumi-2 ● Zana Abasha ● Odishi 1919-2 ● Enguri Jvari 

Centre

Iveria Khashuri ● Kojaeli Mtskheta ● Tori Borjomi ● Meskheti Akhaltsikhe ● Abuli Akhalkalaki ● Mtskheta ● Paravani Ninotsminda

East

Aragvi Dusheti ● WIT Georgia-2 ● Liakhvi Achabeti ● Voyage ● Tbilisi 2016 ● Tiflisi ● Aphkazeti ● Tianeti ● Rustavi-2 ● Gareji Sagarejo ● Sarti Sartichala ● Alazani Gurjaani ● Hereti Chabukiani ● Duruji Kvareli ● Bakhtrioni Akhmeta ● Locomotive Tbilisi-2 ● Kolkhi Gulripshi ● Sinatle ● Iberia 2010 Tbilisi ● 35-e Skola ● Amirani Ochamchire ● Shavnabada ● Samgori ● Tskhumi Sokhumi ● Saburtalo-2 Tbilisi ● Sakartvelos Universiteti ● Dinamo Sokhumi ● Era ● Avaza ● Algeti XXI

Teams and stadiums

Source

League table

The teams were initially divided equally into White and Red Groups. After a two-round tournament they formed Promotion and Relegation groups. The winner won automatic promotion to Erovnuli Liga 2, while the teams in second and third places played against Liga 2 opponents in a two-legged tie.   

All teams of the drop-zone quartet participated in the second tier the previous year, therefore they suffered double relegation in successive seasons.

White Group

Red Group

Promotion Group

Relegation Round

Promotion play-offs 

Telavi won 3–2 on aggregate.

Norchi Dinamo won 6–0 on aggregate.

References

External links
Georgian Football Federation

Liga 3 (Georgia) seasons
3
Georgia
Georgia